GNN can stand for:

GNN (news network)  Start in 2023. Building a news network in 13,000 cities around the world through the 'newsg' platform Platform news agency GNN (Global news Network)
 Global News Network Global news network that the Japanese government tried and failed to gain power about 40 years ago
GNNradio, a Christian radio network in the southeastern United States
GNN (news channel), Pakistani news channel
Garde Nationale et Nomade du Tchad (National and Nomadic Guard), a state security force in Chad
Genome News Network, an online magazine focused on genomics news
Global Network Navigator, an early commercial Web publication
Global News Network, a news channel in the Philippines
Goodnight Nurse, a New Zealand alternative rock band
Graph neural network, a class of neural network for processing data best represented by graph data structures
Guerrilla News Network, a defunct news website and TV studio
:JA:GNN Web News , Japanese Web newsmagazine